The 1986–87 WHL season was the 21st season for the Western Hockey League.  Fourteen teams completed a 72-game season.  The Medicine Hat Tigers won the President's Cup before going on to also capture the Memorial Cup.

League notes
The Lethbridge Broncos returned to Swift Current, Saskatchewan, to become the Swift Current Broncos.
On December 30, 1986, the Swift Current Broncos bus crash caused the deaths of four members of the Swift Current Broncos: Trent Kresse, Scott Kruger, Chris Mantyka, and Brent Ruff.  The WHL would later rename its Most Valuable Player award the Four Broncos Memorial Trophy in their honor.
On March 1, 1987, Regina Pats player Brad Hornung was paralyzed during a game by a check.  The WHL would later rename its Most Sportsmanlike Player award the Brad Hornung Trophy in his honor.

Regular season

Final standings

Scoring leaders
Note: GP = Games played; G = Goals; A = Assists; Pts = Points; PIM = Penalties in minutes

1987 WHL Playoffs

First round
Medicine Hat earned a bye
Saskatoon earned a bye
Prince Albert defeated Swift Current 3 games to 1
Moose Jaw defeated Regina 3 games to 0

Division semi-finals
Medicine Hat defeated Moose Jaw 4 games to 2
Saskatoon defeated Prince Albert 4 games to 0
Kamloops defeated Victoria 5 games to 0
Portland defeated Spokane 5 games to 0

Division finals
Medicine Hat defeated Saskatoon 4 games to 3
Portland defeated Kamloops 5 games to 3

WHL Championship
Medicine Hat defeated Portland 4 games to 3

All-Star game

On January 20, the East Division defeated the West Division 4–3 at Regina, Saskatchewan with a crowd of 3,652.

WHL awards

Note: For the 1986–87 season, the WHL handed out separate awards for the East and West Divisions.

All-Star Teams

See also
1987 Memorial Cup
1987 NHL Entry Draft
1986 in sports
1987 in sports

References
whl.ca
 2005–06 WHL Guide

Western Hockey League seasons
WHL
WHL